Guest House, Inc. is a non-profit, charitable organization that is Commission on Accreditation of Rehabilitation Facilities (CARF) accredited and licensed residential treatment center treating Roman Catholic clergy, religious brothers, and since 1994 religious sisters who suffer from substance use disorders, process addictions, compulsive overeating and co-occurring mental, physical or medical disorders. Opened in 1956 in Lake Orion, Michigan, Guest House is recognized as the first North American provider of residential treatment programs for Catholic clergy, religious and seminarians.

Guest House has 78 combined full-time and part-time employees, and an annual budget in excess of $7 million.

Guest House is intended to provide the information, education, treatment and care needed to assure that Catholic clergy, men٫ and religious women suffering from alcoholism, addictions and other behavioral health conditions have the best opportunity for quality recovery and overall health and wellness.

History 

Guest House was founded by Austin Ripley, who was a nationally renowned mystery fiction writer and author of Minute Mysteries, a popular newspaper column featuring solve-it-yourself crime cases, which was syndicated in more than 170 U.S. newspapers.

Until the early 1940s, Ripley was battling his own crippling addiction to alcohol. As a recovering alcoholic, Ripley observed through priest acquaintances that Catholic priests were not succeeding in overcoming their own addictions through traditional means. Ripley decided to devote himself to the creation of a treatment program that respected not only the religious calling of priests and other religious people but also preserved their dignity as human beings. First opened and closed in Chippewa Falls, Wisconsin in 1951, Guest House was founded on Ripley's profound belief that his program should "save the individual; save the vocation," and in precisely that order. Guest House eventually opened permanently in Lake Orion, Michigan.

Ripley re-opened Guest House on Pentecost Sunday in 1956. The new location of Guest House in Lake Orion was the former home of newspaper magnate William Edmund Scripps. Built in 1927 at a cost of over $2 million, the Scripps Mansion was isolated and had plenty of land which provided a peaceful environment for treatment. The purchase price of the mansion in 1956 was a bargain at only $185,000; however, Ripley did not have enough money to meet the purchase price. He was able to raise the money with the help of the Archdiocese of Detroit, through various fundraising activities and with additional help of the then Archbishop of Detroit, Edward Cardinal Mooney. Mooney was deeply concerned about alcoholic priests in his own archdiocese and had been favorably impressed when some had recovered through the Guest House process in Wisconsin. Ripley obtained the necessary funds required to make the purchase with a loan.

Ripley reasoned that these clergy lacked the support of the Church hierarchy (who were, generally speaking at that time, punitive toward alcoholic priests), and that the average clergyman was better able to recover in the care of laymen, but among men of his own calling, education and lifestyle.

As the need for services grew, Guest House found that there were long waiting periods for admission. In the early 1960s, a routine operation took Rip to the prestigious Mayo Clinic in Rochester, Minnesota, which he felt was a great location for a second Guest House treatment center. In 1967, the ground was broken for the Rochester Treatment Center, and it was opened in 1969.

Guest House responds to an increasing need and opens a program for women religious in 1994 on the Lake Orion campus in the Scripps Mansion.

In 2007, construction is completed on a new treatment center for women religious in Lake Orion, restoring the mansion to continuing care and education use. In the same year, the Scripps Mansion was added to the National Register of Historic Places.

To most efficiently meet the needs of clients, Guest House consolidated in 2014, closing the Rochester center and returning the clergy and men religious to a renovated treatment center in Lake Orion, with the religious women relocating to a new state-of-the-art, handicapped-accessible facility on the Lake Orion grounds. Guest House acquired the Human Development Magazine.

Locations 

Guest House currently treats priests, deacons, religious and seminarians in Lake Orion, Michigan.

Treatment 

Guest House's annual graduates join nearly 1,400 living alumni worldwide and are among over 7,000 cared for since 1956. Most of our alumni still serve the Church as pastors, teachers, counselors and missionaries. Guest House alumni enjoy successful long-term abstinence rates which remain at the top of the recovery industry. Patients come from dioceses and religious communities throughout the United States and around the world.

Primary care 

As part of its principal mission, Guest House currently admits about 65 priests, deacons, brothers, sisters and seminarians per year. The average length of stay ranges from 90–150 days of intensive counseling, education, medical and nutritional support, fellowship, recreation and spiritual renewal and growth.

Guest House's programs have expanded from its original concentration on alcoholism and other chemical addictions (such as to prescription drugs), to include evaluation of and treatment for substance use disorders, process addictions, compulsive overeating and co-occurring mental, physical or medical disorders. Individually-designed treatment programs address all aspects of healing to support quality recovery and overall health and wellness. Through holistic programs based on the spirituality of twelve-step recovery, Guest House restores relationships with God and returns clients to ministry "12-step" programs.

Continuing care 

Following primary residential care, clients are also enrolled in "continuing care," a three to five year program centered on three week-long return visits by the client to Guest House. In continuing care there is additional counseling, education, fellowship and time for more spiritual renewal.

Funding 

Most of Guest House's annual operating budget comes from generous private benefactors through financial contributions from around the world or from special event fundraisers and annual mailings.  Donors can provide outright gifts of cash and stock, remember Guest House in their wills, or establish annuities or trusts for "planned" gifts.  Guest House also has a memorial gift program as well as a program for arranging Mass for donors' special intentions.

Guest House is committed to offering treatment to priests, deacons, brothers, sisters and seminarians who are in need of services regardless of ability to pay. Many clients come with little or no means to pay. Annually, Guest House provides over $1 million in uncompensated care.

See also 
Scripps mansion
Father Ted

References

External links 
 Guest House

Non-profit organizations based in Michigan
Healthcare in Michigan
Healthcare in Minnesota